The National IT and Telecom Agency (NITA) (Danish: IT- og Telestyrelsen) was a Danish agency under the Ministry of Science, Technology and Innovation.

The main task of the Agency was to safeguard the public development in the IT and telecommunications, as the agency was to establish the general rules for public delivery of IT and telecommunications services.

It was abolished by the Cabinet of Helle Thorning-Schmidt and its tasks reassigned to the ministries of the Danish Business Authority and the Danish Agency for Digitisation.

References

External links
 Official website
 Ministry of Science Technology and Innovation

Communications authorities
Communications in Denmark
Regulation in Denmark
Government agencies of Denmark